The Central Michigan Chippewas baseball team is a varsity intercollegiate athletic team of Central Michigan University in Mount Pleasant, Michigan, United States. The team is a member of the Mid-American Conference West division, which is part of the National Collegiate Athletic Association's Division I. Central Michigan's first baseball team was fielded in 1896. The team plays its home games at Theunissen Stadium in Mount Pleasant, Michigan. On June 28, 2018, Jordan Bischel was named the Chippewas' head coach. On May 1, 2021, Jordan Patty pitched the first perfect game in CMU history.

Chippewas in Major League Baseball
Since the Major League Baseball Draft began in 1965, Central Michigan has had 98 players selected.

See also
List of NCAA Division I baseball programs

References

External links
 https://cmuchippewas.com/sports/baseball

 
Baseball teams established in 1896
1896 establishments in Michigan